Héctor Rodrigo Bazán Chiesa (born 15 November 2001) is a Peruvian footballer who plays as a winger.

Club career

Universidad San Martín
After passing by Esther Grande and Sport Boys, Bazán moved to Universidad San Martín in August 2018, where he started on the clubs reserve team. Bazán was called up for his first official game on 29 April 2019 against Alianza Lima, where he was on the bench for the whole game.

On 23 June 2019, Bazán got his professional debut for Universidad San Martín in the Copa Bicentenario against Juan Aurich. Bazán started on the bench before coming on for Jairo Concha in the 50th minute and scoring a goal 11 minutes later. At the end of 2019 the club confirmed, that Bazán had signed a new deal for the 2020 season. Bazán ended the 2019 season with 157 minutes of playing time and one goal.

APS Zakynthos
On 15 January 2022, Bazán joined Greek club A.P.S. Zakynthos.

References

External links
 

Living people
2001 births
Association football wingers
Peruvian footballers
Peruvian expatriate footballers
Footballers from Lima
Esther Grande footballers
Sport Boys footballers
A.P.S. Zakynthos players
Peruvian Primera División players
Club Deportivo Universidad de San Martín de Porres players
Peruvian expatriate sportspeople in Greece
Expatriate footballers in Greece